Kenan Koçak (born 5 January 1981) is a Turkish football coach and a former player. He is an assistant coach with the Turkey national football team.

Playing career
Koçak was a youth product of Waldhof Mannheim. Kocak played sparsely for Waldhof Mannheim, Austria Salzburg, SSV Reutlingen, 1. FC Pforzheim, and finally as a player-manager for Türkspor Mannheim.

Managerial career

VfR Mannheim
In the winter break of the 2010–11 season Kenan Koçak became manager of VfR Mannheim. In his first competitive match as coach, his team was able to knock out the local rival of Waldhof Mannheim in the quarter-final of the Baden Cup. In the regular season, Koçak reached second place with VfR Mannheim in the Verbandsliga Baden. In the promotion play-off, his team faced FV Ravensburg. The first leg ended in a 1–1 draw. The second match was won by Mannheim with 2–0. As a result, Mannheim reached the Oberliga Baden-Württemberg. In his first Oberliga season, Koçak's team finished in second place. After the first half of the 2011–12 season, VfR Mannheim was even at the top of the Oberliga. In the 2012–13 season, Mannheim finished in third place. After this season, Koçak left the club and became manager of Waldhof Mannheim, which played in the Regionalliga Südwest at the time.

Waldhof Mannheim
Waldhof Mannheim hired Koçak on 7 June 2013 and had his first match on 29 July 2013 against SSV Ulm. The final score was 4–2 for Waldhof Mannheim. The club finished the 2013–14 season in fifth place. In the following season, Waldhof Mannheim dropped down to 13th place. Waldhof Mannheim won the Regionalliga Südwest during the 2015–16 season. In the promotion play-off, they faced off against Sportfreunde Lotte. The first leg ended in a 0–0 draw and the second leg ended in a 2–0 win for Lotte. Koçak left Waldhof Mannheim on 3 July 2016 to become manager of SV Sandhausen.

SV Sandhausen
Koçak became manager of Sandhausen on 3 July 2016. Kocak's debut match was a 2–2 draw against Fortuna Düsseldorf. His first win with Sandhausen came on 22 August 2016 in a 2–1 win against SC Paderborn. He was sacked on 8 October 2018.

Hannover 96
On 14 November 2019, Koçak was appointed as manager of Hannover 96. He left at the end of the 2020–21 season.

Turkey
On 27 September 2021, Turkish Football Federation announced that Koçak joined in technical staff of Turkey as Assistant Coach to Stefan Kuntz.

Managerial statistics

References

External links

1981 births
Turkish footballers
Turkish football managers
German footballers
German football managers
German people of Turkish descent
Turkish emigrants to Germany
Austrian Football Bundesliga players
2. Bundesliga players
2. Bundesliga managers
FC Red Bull Salzburg players
SV Waldhof Mannheim players
SV Waldhof Mannheim managers
SV Sandhausen managers
Hannover 96 managers
Living people
Association football midfielders
People from Kayseri
Footballers from Mannheim